Warren Township is one of the fourteen townships of Jefferson County, Ohio, United States.  The 2010 census found 4,232 people in the township, 1,828 of whom lived in the unincorporated portions of the township.

Geography
Located in the southeastern corner of the county along the Ohio River, it borders the following townships:
Wells Township - north
Pease Township, Belmont County - south
Mount Pleasant Township - southwest
Smithfield Township - northwest

West Virginia lies across the Ohio River to the east: Brooke County to the northeast, and Ohio County to the southeast.

Three villages are located along the Ohio River in southeastern Warren Township:
Part of Yorkville, farthest downstream
Tiltonsville, in the middle
Rayland, farthest upstream
Two unincorporated communities: 
 Hopewell, in the northern part of the township
 Rush Run, along the Ohio River

Name and history
Warren Township was founded in 1802.

It is one of five Warren Townships statewide.

Government
The township is governed by a three-member board of trustees, who are elected in November of odd-numbered years to a four-year term beginning on the following January 1. Two are elected in the year after the presidential election and one is elected in the year before it. There is also an elected township fiscal officer, who serves a four-year term beginning on April 1 of the year after the election, which is held in November of the year before the presidential election. Vacancies in the fiscal officership or on the board of trustees are filled by the remaining trustees.

References

External links
County website

Townships in Jefferson County, Ohio
Townships in Ohio